Édith Piaf (born Édith Giovanne Gassion, ; December 19, 1915– October 10, 1963) was a French singer, lyricist and actress. Noted as France's national chanteuse, she was one of the country's most widely known international stars.

Piaf's music was often autobiographical, and she specialized in chanson réaliste and torch ballads about love, loss and sorrow. Her most widely known songs include "La Vie en rose" (1946), "Non, je ne regrette rien" (1960), "Hymne à l'amour" (1949), "Milord" (1959), "La Foule" (1957), "L'Accordéoniste" (1940), and "Padam, padam..." (1951).

Since her death in 1963, several biographies and films have studied her life, including 2007's La Vie en rose. Piaf has become one of the most celebrated performers of the 20th century.

Family
Despite numerous biographies, much of Piaf's life is unknown. She was born Édith Giovanna Gassion in Belleville, Paris. Her birth certificate states that she was born on December 19, 1915 at the Hôpital Tenon, a hospital located in the 20th arrondissement.

She was named Édith after the World War I British nurse Edith Cavell, who was executed 2 months before Édith's birth for helping French soldiers escape from German captivity. Piaf – slang for "sparrow" – was a nickname she received 20 years later.

Louis Alphonse Gassion (1881–1944), Édith's father, was a street performer of acrobatics from Normandy with a past in the theatre. He was the son of Victor Alphonse Gassion (1850–1928) and Léontine Louise Descamps (1860–1937), known as Maman Tine, a "madam" who ran a brothel in Bernay in Normandy.

Her mother, Annetta Giovanna Maillard, better known professionally as Line Marsa (1895–1945), was a singer and circus performer born in Italy of French descent on her father's side and of Italian and Kabyle on her mother's. Her parents were Auguste Eugène Maillard (1866–1912) and Emma (Aïcha) Saïd Ben Mohammed (1876–1930), daughter of Said ben Mohammed (1827–1890), an acrobat born in Mogador and Marguerite Bracco (1830–1898), born in Murazzano in Italy.

Annetta and Louis-Alphonse divorced on June 4, 1929.

Early life

Piaf's mother abandoned her at birth, and she lived for a short time with her maternal grandmother, Emma (Aïcha). When her father enlisted with the French Army in 1916 to fight in World War I, he took her to his mother, who ran a brothel in Bernay, Normandy. There, prostitutes helped look after Piaf. The bordello had two floors and seven rooms, and the prostitutes were not very numerous – "about ten poor girls", as she later described. In fact, five or six were permanent while a dozen others would join the brothel during market days and other busy days. The sub-mistress of the brothel was called "Madam Gaby" and Piaf considered her almost like family since she became godmother of Denise Gassion, Piaf's half-sister born in 1931.  

From the age of three to seven, Piaf was allegedly blind as a result of keratitis. According to one of her biographers, she recovered her sight after her grandmother's prostitutes pooled money to accompany her on a pilgrimage honouring Saint Thérèse of Lisieux. Piaf claimed this was the result of miraculous healing.

In 1929, at age 14, she was taken by her father to join him in his acrobatic street performances all over France, where she first began to sing in public. At the age of 15, Piaf met , who may have been her half-sister, and who became a companion for most of her life. Together they toured the streets singing and earning money for themselves. With the additional money Piaf earned as part of an acrobatic trio, she and Mômone were able to rent their own place; Piaf took a room at Grand Hôtel de Clermont (18 , 18th arrondissement of Paris), working with Mômone as a street singer in Pigalle, Ménilmontant, and the Paris suburbs (cf. the song "Elle fréquentait la rue Pigalle").

In 1932, she met and fell in love with Louis Dupont. Within a very short time, he moved into their small room, where the three lived despite Louis' and Mômone's dislike for each other. Louis was never happy with the idea of Piaf's roaming the streets and continually persuaded her to take jobs he found for her. She resisted his suggestions until she became pregnant and worked for a short while making wreaths in a factory.

In February 1933, the 17-year-old Piaf gave birth to her daughter, Marcelle (nicknamed Cécelle) at the Hôpital Tenon. Like her mother, Piaf found it difficult to care for the child and had little parenting knowledge. She rapidly returned to street singing, until the summer of 1933, when she started performing at Juan-les-Pins, Rue Pigalle.

Following an intense quarrel over her behavior, Piaf left Louis Dupont (Marcelle's father) taking Mômone and Marcelle with her. The three stayed at the Hôtel Au Clair de Lune, Rue André-Antoine. During this time, Marcelle was often left alone in the room while Piaf and Mômone were out on the streets or at the club singing. Dupont eventually came and took Marcelle away, saying that if Édith wanted the child, she must come home. Like her own mother, Piaf decided not to come home, though she did pay for childcare. Marcelle died of meningitis at age two.

Singing career 

In 1935, Piaf was discovered in the Pigalle area of Paris by nightclub owner Louis Leplée, whose club Le Gerny's off the Champs-Élysées was frequented by the upper and lower classes alike. He persuaded her to sing despite her extreme nervousness, which, combined with her height of only , inspired him to give her the nickname that would stay with her for the rest of her life and serve as her stage name, La Môme Piaf (Paris slang meaning "The Waif Sparrow" or "The Little Sparrow"). Leplée taught her the basics of stage presence and told her to wear a black dress, which became her trademark apparel.

Leplée ran an intense publicity campaign leading up to her opening night, attracting the presence of many celebrities, including actor and singer Maurice Chevalier. The bandleader that evening was Django Reinhardt, with his pianist, Norbert Glanzberg. Her nightclub gigs led to her first two records produced that same year, with one of them penned by Marguerite Monnot, a collaborator throughout Piaf's life and one of her favourite composers.

On April 6, 1936, Leplée was murdered. Piaf was questioned and accused as an accessory, but acquitted. Leplée had been killed by mobsters with previous ties to Piaf. A barrage of negative media attention now threatened her career. To rehabilitate her image, she recruited Raymond Asso, with whom she would become romantically involved. He changed her stage name to "Édith Piaf", barred undesirable acquaintances from seeing her, and commissioned Monnot to write songs that reflected or alluded to Piaf's previous life on the streets.

In 1940, Piaf co-starred in Jean Cocteau's successful one-act play Le Bel Indifférent. The German occupation of Paris did not stop her career; she began forming friendships with prominent people, including Chevalier and poet Jacques Bourgeat. She wrote the lyrics of many of her songs and collaborated with composers on the tunes. Spring 1944 saw the first cooperation and a love affair with Yves Montand in the Moulin Rouge.

In 1947, she wrote the lyrics to the song "Mais qu'est-ce que j'ai ?" (music by Henri Betti) for Yves Montand. She contributed greatly to the revolutionizing of the cabaret-genre. Within a year, he became one of the most famous singers in France. She broke off their relationship when he had become almost as popular as she was.

During this time, she was in great demand and very successful in Paris as France's most popular entertainer. After the war, she became known internationally, touring Europe, the United States, and South America. In Paris, she gave Atahualpa Yupanqui (Héctor Roberto Chavero) – a central figure in the Argentine folk music tradition – the opportunity to share the scene, making his debut in July 1950. She helped launch the career of Charles Aznavour in the early 1950s, taking him on tour with her in France and the United States and recording some of his songs. At first she met with little success with American audiences, who expected a gaudy spectacle and were disappointed by Piaf's simple presentation. After a glowing 1947 review in the New York Herald Tribune by the influential New York critic Virgil Thomson, himself a contributor to international avant-garde culture, her popularity grew to the point where she eventually appeared on The Ed Sullivan Show eight times, and at Carnegie Hall twice (1956 and 1957).

Piaf wrote and performed her signature song, "La Vie en rose", in 1945 and it was voted a Grammy Hall of Fame Award in 1998.

Bruno Coquatrix's famous Paris Olympia music hall is where Piaf achieved lasting fame, giving several series of concerts at the hall, the most famous venue in Paris, between January 1955 and October 1962. Excerpts from five of these concerts (1955, 1956, 1958, 1961, 1962) were issued on record and on CD, and have never been out of print. In the 1961 concerts, promised by Piaf in an effort to save the venue from bankruptcy, she first sang "Non, je ne regrette rien". In April 1963, Piaf recorded her last song, "L'Homme de Berlin".

Role during the German occupation 

Piaf's career and fame gained momentum during the German occupation of France. She performed in various nightclubs and brothels, which flourished between 1940-1945. Various top Paris brothels, including Le Chabanais, Le Sphinx, One Two Two, La rue des Moulins, and Chez Marguerite, were reserved for German officers and collaborating Frenchmen. Piaf was invited to take part in a concert tour to Berlin, sponsored by the German officials, together with artists such as Loulou Gasté, Raymond Souplex, Viviane Romance and Albert Préjean. In 1942, she was able to afford a luxury flat in a house in the fancy 16th arrondissement of Paris (today rue Paul-Valéry). She lived above the L'Étoile de Kléber, a famous nightclub and bordello close to the Paris Gestapo headquarters.

Piaf was deemed to have been a traitor and collaborator. She had to testify before a purge panel, as there were plans to ban her from appearing on radio transmissions. However, her secretary Andrée Bigard, a member of the Résistance, spoke in her favour after the Liberation. According to Bigard, she performed several times at prisoner-of-war camps in Germany and was instrumental in helping a number of prisoners escape. Piaf was very popular among Nazis; therefore, she was able to help those living difficult times. In fact, at the beginning of World War II, she worked professionally with Michel Emer, a famous Jewish musician whose song "L'Accordéoniste" was soon adored by many. Piaf paid for Emer's way into France before German occupation. He lived in France in safety until the liberation. Piaf was quickly back in the singing business and in December 1944, she went on stage for the Allied forces together with Montand in Marseille.

Personal life

At age 17 Piaf had a daughter, Marcelle, who died aged two. Piaf neither wanted nor had other children.

The love of Piaf's life, the married boxer Marcel Cerdan, died in a plane crash in October 1949, while flying from Paris to New York City to meet her. Cerdan's Air France flight, on a Lockheed Constellation, crashed in the Azores, killing everyone on board, including noted violinist Ginette Neveu. Piaf and Cerdan's affair made international headlines, as Cerdan was the former middleweight world champion and a legend in France in his own right.

In 1951, Piaf was seriously injured in a car crash along with Charles Aznavour, breaking her arm and two ribs, and thereafter had serious difficulties arising from morphine and alcohol addictions. Two more near-fatal car crashes exacerbated the situation. Jacques Pills, a singer, took her into rehabilitation on three different occasions to no avail.

Piaf married Jacques Pills (real name René Ducos), her first husband, in 1952 (her matron of honour was Marlene Dietrich) and divorced him in 1957. In 1962, she wed Théo Sarapo (Theophanis Lamboukas), a singer, actor, and former hairdresser who was born in France of Greek descent. Sarapo was 20 years her junior. The couple sang together in some of her last engagements.

Piaf lived mainly in Belleville, Paris, with her father from 1915 to 1931. From 1934 to 1941, she lived at 45 rue de Chézy in Neuilly-sur-Seine; she lived alone from 1941 to 1952 and with Jacques Pills from 1952 to 1956. She continued to live there alone from 1956 to 1959. In her final years, she lived at 23 rue Édouard Nortier in Neuilly-sur-Seine – alone from 1959 to 1962 and with Théo Sarapo from 1962 until her death in 1963.

Death and legacy

Years of alcohol abuse alongside copious amounts of medications, initially for rheumatoid arthritis and later insomnia, took their toll on Piaf's health. A series of car accidents only exacerbated her addictions and she eventually underwent a series of surgeries for a stomach ulcer in 1959. Coupled with a deteriorating liver and the need for a blood transfusion, by 1962 she had lost a significant amount of weight, reaching a low of 30 kg (66 pounds). Piaf drifted in and out of consciousness for several months. She died at age 47 on October 10, 1963, at her villa on the French Riviera in Plascassier (Grasse). The cause of death is believed to be  liver failure due to liver cancer and cirrhosis, though no autopsy was performed.

Her last words were "Every damn thing you do in this life, you have to pay for." It is said that Sarapo drove her body back to Paris secretly so that fans would think she had died in her hometown. Her old friend Jean Cocteau died the very next day; it was reported that he had a heart attack on hearing of Piaf's death.

She is buried in Père Lachaise Cemetery in Paris next to her daughter Marcelle, where her grave is among the most visited. Buried in the same grave are her father, Louis-Alphonse Gassion, and Théo (Lamboukas) Sarapo. The name inscribed at the foot of the tombstone is Famille Gassion-Piaf. Her name is engraved on the side as Madame Lamboukas dite Édith Piaf.

Although she was denied a funeral Mass by Cardinal Maurice Feltin since she had remarried after divorce in the Orthodox Church, her funeral procession drew tens of thousands of mourners onto the streets of Paris, and the ceremony at the cemetery was attended by more than 100,000 fans. Charles Aznavour recalled that Piaf's funeral procession was the only time since the end of World War II that he saw Parisian traffic come to a complete stop. On October 10th, 2013, fifty years after her death, the Roman Catholic Church recanted and gave Piaf a memorial Mass in the St. Jean-Baptiste Church in Belleville, Paris, the parish into which she was born.

Since 1963, the French media have continually published magazines, books, plays, television specials and films about the star often on the anniversary of her death. In 1973, the Association of the Friends of Édith Piaf was formed, followed by the inauguration of the Place Édith Piaf in Belleville in 1981. Soviet astronomer Lyudmila Georgievna Karachkina named a small planet, 3772 Piaf, in her honor.

In Paris, a two-room museum is dedicated to her, the Musée Édith Piaf (5, Rue Crespin du Gast).

A concert at The Town Hall in New York City commemorated the 100th anniversary of Piaf's birth on 19 December 2015. Hosted by Robert Osborne and produced by Daniel Nardicio and Andy Brattain, it featured Little Annie, Gay Marshall, Amber Martin, Marilyn Maye, Meow Meow, Elaine Paige, Molly Pope, Vivian Reed, Kim David Smith, and Aaron Weinstein.

Films about Piaf
Piaf's life has been the subject of several films and plays.

Piaf (1974), directed by Guy Casaril, depicted her early years
Piaf (1978), play by Pam Gems
Édith et Marcel (1983), directed by Claude Lelouch, Piaf's relationship with Cerdan
Piaf ... Her Story ... Her Songs (2003), by Raquel Bitton
La Vie en rose (2007), directed by Olivier Dahan, with Marion Cotillard who won an Academy Award for Best Actress
The Sparrow and the Birdman (2010), by Raquel Bitton
Edith Piaf Alive (2011), by Flo Ankah
Piaf, voz y delirio (2017), by Leonardo Padrón.

Songs discography
1933
 

1934
 

1935
 
 
 

1936

 Les Mômes de la cloche
 
 
 
 
 
 
 
 
 
  (from the film La Garçonne)
 
 
 
 
 
 
 
 
 
 
 
 
 
 

1937

 
 
 
 
  (with Raymond Asso)
 
 

1938

 
 
 
 
 
 

1939

 
 
 
 
 

1940

 
 
 
 
 
 L'Accordéoniste

1941

 
 
 
  (from the film Montmartre-sur-Seine)
  (from the film Montmartre-sur-Seine)
 
 

1942
 
  (from the film Montmartre-sur-Seine)
 
 

1943

 
 
 
 
 
 
 
 
 
 
 
 
 

1944
 
 
 
 

1945

 
 
 
 
 
 

1946

 
  (with Les Compagnons de la chanson)
 
 
  (from the film Étoile sans lumière)
 
 
  (with Les Compagnons de la Chanson)
 
  (with Les Compagnons de la Chanson)
  (with Les Compagnons de la Chanson)
  (with Les Compagnons de la Chanson)
 
 
 
 

1947

  (from the film Neuf garçons, un cœur)
 
  (from the film Neuf garçons, un cœur)
 
 
 
 
 
 
 
 
 

1948

 
 
 
 
 
 
 
 

1949

 
 
 
 
 
 
  (from the film )

1950

 Hymne à l'amour
 
 
 
 
 
 
 
 Hymn to Love
 Autumn Leaves
 The Three Bells
 
 
 Simply a Waltz
  (English version)

1951

 
 
 
 
 
  (with Eddie Constantine)
 
  (with Eddie Constantine)
 
 
 
 
 
 
 
 Jezebel
  (with M. Jiteau)
 
 
 

1952

 
 
 
 
  (from the film Boum sur Paris)
 
  (with Jacques Pills) (from the film Boum sur Paris)

1953

 
 
 
 
 
 Johnny, tu n'es pas un ange
 
 
  (with Jacques Pills) (from the film Boum sur Paris)
 
 
 

1954

 
 
 
 
  (from the film Si Versailles m'était conté)
 
 
  (from the film French Cancan)
 

1955

 
 
 
 
 
 

1956

 Heaven Have Mercy
 One Little Man
 'Cause I Love You
  (English)
 Don't Cry
 I Shouldn't Care
 My Lost Melody
 
 
 
 
 
 
 
 

1957

 
 
 
 
 
 

1958

 
 
 
 
 
 
 
 
 
 
 
 
 
 

1959
 
 

1960

 
 
 
 
 
 
 
 
 
 
 
 
 
 
 Mon Dieu
 
 
 
 
 
 
 
 
 

1961

 
 
 
 
 
 
 
 
 
 
 No Regrets
 
 
 
 
 Mon Dieu (English version)
 
 

1962

 
  (with Théo Sarapo)
 
 
  (with Charles Dumont)
 
  (with Mikis Theodorakis/Jacques Plante)
 
 
 
 
 
 
 
 
 
 
 

1963

 
 
 
 
 
 
 
 
  (with Théo Sarapo)
  (her last recording)

Filmography
 La garçonne (1936), Jean de Limur
 Montmartre-sur-Seine (1941), Georges Lacombe
 Star Without Light (1946), Marcel Blistène
 Neuf garçons, un cœur (1947), Georges Freedland
 Paris Still Sings (1951), Pierre Montazel
 Boum sur Paris (1953), Maurice de Canonge
 Si Versailles m'était conté (1954), Sacha Guitry
 French Cancan (1954), Jean Renoir
 Música de Siempre (1958), sang "La vida en rosa", the Spanish version of "La Vie en rose".
 Les Amants de demain (1959), Marcel Blistène

Theatre credits
  (1940), Jean Cocteau

Discography
The following titles are compilations of Piaf's songs and not reissues of the titles released while Piaf was active.

 Edith Piaf: Edith Piaf (Music For Pleasure MFP 1396) 1961
 Ses Plus Belles Chansons (Contour 6870505) 1969
 The Voice of the Sparrow: The Very Best of Édith Piaf, original release date: June 1991
 Édith Piaf: 30th Anniversaire, original release date: April 5, 1994
 Édith Piaf: Her Greatest Recordings 1935–1943, original release date: July 15, 1995
 The Early Years: 1938–1945, Vol. 3, original release date: October 15, 1996
 Hymn to Love: All Her Greatest Songs in English, original release date: November 4, 1996
 Gold Collection, original release date: January 9, 1998
 The Rare Piaf 1950–1962 (April 28, 1998)
 La Vie en rose, original release date: January 26, 1999
 Montmartre Sur Seine (soundtrack import), original release date: September 19, 2000
 Éternelle: The Best Of (January 29, 2002)
 Love and Passion (boxed set), original release date: April 8, 2002
 The Very Best of Édith Piaf (import), original release date: October 29, 2002
 75 Chansons (Box set/import), original release date: September 22, 2005
 48 Titres Originaux (import), (09/01/2006)
 Édith Piaf: L'Intégrale/Complete 20 CD/413 Chansons, original release date: February 27, 2007
 Édith Piaf: The Absolutely Essential 3 CD Collection/Proper Records UK, original release date: May 31, 2011

On DVD
 Édith Piaf: A Passionate Life (May 24, 2004)
 Édith Piaf: Eternal Hymn (Éternelle, l'hymne à la môme, PAL, Region 2, import)
 Piaf: Her Story, Her Songs (June 2006)
 Piaf: La Môme (2007)
 La Vie en rose (biopic, 2007)
 Édith Piaf: The Perfect Concert and Piaf: The Documentary (February 2009)

See also
 Music of France
 French popular music

References

Sources
 The Wheel of Fortune: The Autobiography of Édith Piaf by Édith Piaf, translated by Peter Trewartha and Andrée Masoin de Virton. Peter Owen Publishers;  (originally published 1958 as Au bal de la chance)

Further reading 
 , translated into English
 The Piaf Legend, by David Bret, Robson Books, 1988.
 Piaf: A Passionate Life, by David Bret, Robson Books, 1998, revised JR Books, 2007
 "The Sparrow – Edith Piaf", chapter in Singers & The Song (pp. 23–43), by Gene Lees, Oxford University Press, 1987, insightful critique of Piaf's biography and music.
 Marlene, My Friend, by David Bret, Robson Books, 1993. Dietrich dedicates a whole chapter to her friendship with Piaf.
 Oh! Père Lachaise, by Jim Yates, Édition d'Amèlie 2007, . Piaf and Oscar Wilde meet in a pink-tinted Parisian Purgatory.
  Find Me a New Way to Die: Édith Piaf's Untold Story by David Bret, Oberon Books, 2016.
 Piaf, by Margaret Crosland. New York: G. P. Putnam's Sons, 1985, . A biography.
 Édith Piaf, secrète et publique, [by] Denise Gassion (sister of É. Piaf) & Robert Morcet, Ergo Press, 1988; 
 Edith Piaf: Her Songs & The Stories Behind Them Translated Into English: Volume One: The Polydor Years 1935-1945 by David Bret, Independently published, 2021.

External links

 
 
 Édith Piaf's songs
 Genealogy of Édith Piaf, Généalogie magazine, n° 233, pp. 30–36
 Edith Piaf and her Paris
 
 Falling down the rabbit hole with Edith Piaf, in Bernay – childhood in Normandy.

 
1915 births
1963 deaths
French buskers
French women pop singers
Cabaret singers
Torch singers
French Resistance members
Capitol Records artists
EMI Records artists
Parlophone artists
Pathé-Marconi artists
French people of Italian descent
French people of Norman descent
French people of Berber descent
French people of Kabyle descent
People of Piedmontese descent
Alcohol-related deaths in France
Deaths from cancer in France
Deaths from liver cancer
Burials at Père Lachaise Cemetery
Singers from Paris
20th-century French women singers
Female resistance members of World War II
French women in World War II
Ballad musicians